Burbank is a small farming unincorporated community located on the western edge of  Millard County, Utah, United States, just east of the Nevada border. It is located in the southern part of Snake Valley, near the opening (northern border) of Hamlin Valley.

History
It was founded as a Mormon farming community in the 1870s, with an early post office located at the Dearden Ranch. It was named after Margie Burbank Clay, the wife of local Judge E. W. Clay. Margie's obituary states that it was named in August 1949 after her mother when she, Margie, was age 96.  Her mother was Laura Ann (Willard) Burbank (1819-1893). Clay was used as the name of the major spring that was first used by the settlers. This spring is the main source of water for Pruess Lake, to the north. Outlaws, cattle rustlers, and uncertainty over the local water sources caused the abandonment of the community, with the exception of the Dearden Ranch.

The Dearden Ranch was started in 1886 and has been home to the Dearden family ever since. The local springs that flow into Lake Creek have been informally named after the ranch, but are not named on maps or other documents, with the exception of water rights documents, which do name it Dearden Springs.

References

External links

Unincorporated communities in Millard County, Utah
Unincorporated communities in Utah
Populated places established in the 1870s
Great Basin National Heritage Area